For the defunct punk rock record label, see: Tarantulas Records

Tarantula Records was created by Jamaican recording artist Tanya Stephens and her life partner Andrew Henton. The label was set up because Tanya desired more freedom over her music and lyrics. Henton makes the beats out of his home and she records at hers. Since being founded in 2004, the label has released three albums. VP Records handled distribution for albums Gangsta Blues and Rebelution. Infallible was an online, free album. The only hard copies were given out with "Riddim" magazine.

Discography

"-" denotes the album did not chart.

References

Record labels established in 2004
Reggae record labels